The Bai Bureh Warriors of Port Loko commonly known as Bai Bureh Warriors is a Sierra Leonean professional football (soccer) club based in Port Loko, Port Loko District, Sierra Leone.

The club is currently playing in the Sierra Leone National First Division, the second highest football league in Sierra Leone.. Bai Bureh Warriors spent many years in the Sierra Leone National Premier League before being relegated to the second division in 2005.

The club is named after Bai Bureh, a great Sierra Leonean warrior and military strategist who led the Temne Uprising against the British in 1898.

Bai Bureh Warriors won the Sierra Leonean FA Cup Cup in 1978 and 1982 and their best performance in any Caf competitions came in 1979 when they reached the second round of the CAF Cup Winners' Cup.

Achievements
Sierra Leonean FA Cup: 2
 1978, 1982

Performance in CAF competitions
CAF Cup Winners' Cup: 2 appearances
1979 – Second Round
1983 – First Round

References

Football clubs in Sierra Leone